Sign o' the Times (often stylized as Sign "☮︎" the Times) is the ninth studio album by American singer, songwriter, producer, and multi-instrumentalist Prince. It was first released on March 30, 1987 as a double album by Paisley Park Records and Warner Bros. Records. The album is the follow-up to Parade and is Prince's first solo album following his disbanding of the Revolution. The album's songs were largely recorded during 1986 to 1987 in sessions for releases Prince ultimately aborted: Dream Factory, the pseudonymous Camille, and finally the triple album Crystal Ball. Prince eventually compromised with label executives and shortened the length of the release to a double album.

Many of the drum sounds on Sign o' the Times came from the Linn LM-1 drum machine, and Prince used the Fairlight CMI synthesizer to replace other instruments. Minimal instrumentation is heard on the stripped-down "Sign o’ the Times", the lead single. Four songs contain higher-pitched vocals to represent Prince's alter ego "Camille". The album's music touches on a varied range of styles, including funk, soul, psychedelic pop, electro, and rock.

Sign o' the Times release was supported by several singles, among them the socially conscious "Sign o' the Times" and "If I Was Your Girlfriend"; in addition to a well-received concert film of the same name. The album peaked at number six on the Billboard 200 and was certified platinum by the Recording Industry Association of America (RIAA) four months after its release. It also reached the top 10 in Austria, France, New Zealand, Norway, Sweden, and the UK and number one in Switzerland. "Sign o' the Times", "U Got the Look" and "I Could Never Take the Place of Your Man" were all top 10 hits on the Billboard Hot 100. Following Prince's death in 2016, the album re-entered the Billboard 200 at number 20.

Though not as commercially successful as Purple Rain, Sign o' the Times was Prince's most acclaimed album, being voted 1987's best album in the Pazz & Jop critics poll. Included in many lists of the greatest albums of all time, it has been appraised by many critics as Prince's best album, ahead of Purple Rain. Writing for The Rolling Stone Album Guide (2004), Michaelangelo Matos regarded it as "the most complete example of [Prince's] artistry's breadth, and arguably the finest album of the 1980s". In 2017, the album was inducted into the Grammy Hall of Fame.

Background 
Prior to the disbanding of the Revolution, Prince was working on two separate projects: The Revolution album Dream Factory and a pseudonymous solo effort, Camille. Unlike the three previous band albums, Dream Factory included input from the band members and lead vocals by Wendy & Lisa. The Camille project saw Prince create an androgynous persona primarily singing in a higher, female-sounding voice. With the dismissal of the Revolution, Prince consolidated material from both shelved albums, along with some new songs, into a three-LP album to be titled Crystal Ball. Warner Bros. balked at the idea of trying to sell a three-LP album and forced Prince to trim it down to a double album. Prince cut seven tracks, and also reformulated the album to accommodate the newly added title track.

Recording
As with many of Prince's early 1980s albums, this album features extensive use of the Linn LM-1 drum machine on most songs. In addition, many songs on the album (such as "If I Was Your Girlfriend") feature minimal instrumentation, and use of the Fairlight CMI, a then state-of-the-art digital sampler. Unlike many of his contemporaries, Prince used the stock sounds of the Fairlight to create the title track. Four of the album's standout songs, "Housequake", "Strange Relationship", "U Got the Look" with Sheena Easton, and "If I Was Your Girlfriend"  use pitch-shifted vocals to create a higher voice, ostensibly the voice of "Camille", Prince's alter ego of this era.

Prince was known for recording his vocals in the control room area of the studio. Typically, in the recording process, a vocalist records in the recording booth, separated from the control room by a window or soundproof door. To have privacy during the vocal recording process, Prince usually asked his engineer, Susan Rogers, to leave the room. Rogers recalls:

On some occasions, Prince recorded vocals with his back to her. Prince monitored the vocals with a pair of headphones so Prince's recording microphone would not pick up the speakers she would usually have used. Prince typically used a Sennheiser 441 dynamic microphone (recommended to him by Stevie Nicks) for recording vocals at this stage in his career. Susan Rogers also recalled the speed of Prince's creative process, saying "[the] songs came out like a sneeze, one track after the next, after the next." She also noticed a problem with the sound desk—which had been newly installed—during the recording of "The Ballad of Dorothy Parker", which resulted in a sound matching the "underwater dream state" of the song.

Although Sign o' the Times was regarded by some as less polished than his earlier efforts (one review said it sounded like outtakes, "except nobody else’s outtakes would sound so strong, rock so hard, swing so free") Prince pointed out that he (and his record company) "spent more time and money" on Sign o' the Times than anything he'd ever done, adding that "[much] more work went into it."

Two of the album's songs were first recorded in 1979 and 1983: "I Could Never Take the Place of Your Man" and "Strange Relationship". Prince did additional work on both for their placement on the Dream Factory project and involved the "Wendy & Lisa" partnership of Wendy Melvoin and Lisa Coleman on the former. When the project was canceled, "Strange Relationship" was further updated for Camille. The remaining tracks were recorded between March and December 1986. The surviving Camille tracks feature a playful high-pitch vocal. "U Got the Look" was also recorded in this manner, though it was not intended for the Camille album.

Music and lyrics 
Described by Rolling Stone as "the most expansive R&B record" of the 1980s, Sign o' the Times encompasses a wide range of styles. Music critic Stephen Thomas Erlewine said Prince utilizes a palette of genres, "from bare-bones electro-funk and smooth soul to pseudo-psychedelic pop and crunching hard rock, touching on gospel, blues, and folk along the way". Similarly, writer and Prince scholar Ben Greenman observes "spooky political R&B, full-throated psychedelic pop, bone-rattling skeletal funk, and pocket soul so gentle and nuanced you could almost call it folk". According to music journalist Touré, the album is Prince's foray into soul more than anything, while writer and composer Paul Grimstad deemed the record an example of avant-pop. Prince's use of the drum machine throughout the album is an example of "authentic rock music [made] with computers", Yuzima Philip writes in Observer. In the opinion of Star Tribune journalist Jon Bream, the music can be described as an absolute "balance of everything" the artist had explored stylistically up to that point, including "grinding funk, catchy pop, anthemic rock, tender balladry".

Regarding the themes explored throughout the album, MTV News writer Hanif Abdurraqib said it functions "as a political action" and "that the politics are not those of solutions, but those of survival in the face of that which you might not survive for much longer. The politics of survival say that we may dance in the face of a coming apocalypse. We may, in the face of a coming apocalypse, go to bed with someone we love or someone we didn’t know before the night started. We may play in the streets, or fantasize about a new world to run into. On Sign ‘O’ The Times, after laying out the terrifying landscape, Prince pushes the landscape aside, lays out all of our options for survival on a table, and tells us to take our pick."

Release 
Sign o' the Times was released on March 30, 1987, in the United Kingdom, and one day later in the United States and France. It peaked at number six on the Billboard 200, reached the top 10 in Austria, France, New Zealand, Norway, Sweden, and the UK, and reached number one in Switzerland.  The singles "Sign o' the Times", "U Got the Look" and "I Could Never Take the Place of Your Man" reached number three, two and ten on the Billboard Hot 100, respectively. Following Prince's death in 2016, the album re-charted on the Billboard 200 at number 20.

Though it is regarded as one of Prince's best albums, it did not sell as well as his three preceding releases. Prince did not tour Sign o' the Times in the US (he also cancelled the UK dates, meaning the tour only reached mainland Europe); furthermore, it was released into a market which, throughout 1987, welcomed a fair few classic albums. These included Michael Jackson's Bad, George Michael's Faith, Madonna's Who's That Girl, Def Leppard's Hysteria and U2's The Joshua Tree.

Remastered, Deluxe and Super Deluxe re-issues
The album was reissued in Remastered, Deluxe and Super Deluxe editions on September 25, 2020. The Super Deluxe edition contains nine discs with a remaster of the original album, all 13 single, maxi-single and B-side tracks, 45 previously unreleased tracks, and two complete live recordings of the Sign o' the Times Tour: one audio performance recorded at stadium Galgenwaard in Utrecht, The Netherlands, on June 20, 1987, and one video performance shot at Paisley Park on December 31, 1987. In addition, a 7" vinyl singles box set limited to 1,987 units was released, containing remastered audio for all four official 7” singles released in 1987, as well as the two official Warner Records promo singles and a brand new 7” single comprising two versions of the previously unreleased track “Witness 4 The Prosecution”.

Artwork
All photo images for “Sign O‘ The Times“ album and promotion, including tour book, were photographed by Jeff Katz.

Critical reception 
Sign o' the Times became Prince's most critically acclaimed record. Reviewing for Spin in 1987, Bart Bull said the musician's loosely organized songs are "genius" rather than indulgent and that, although there is no song as groundbreaking as "Girls & Boys", "nobody else's outtakes would sound so strong, rock so hard, swing so free." Don McLeese from the Chicago Sun-Times hailed it as "a one-man show, a tour de force, and a confirmation that pop's former prodigy has come of age." In The Village Voice, Robert Christgau said the album is not a "formal breakthrough" but rather "the most gifted pop musician of his generation proving what a motherfucker he is for two discs start to finish." He particularly praised Prince's "one-man band tricks" and multi-tracked vocals, which he said "make Stevie Wonder sound like a struggling ventriloquist" and express real emotions: "The objects of his desire are also objects of interest, affection, and respect. Some of them he may not even fuck."

Sign o' the Times was nominated for Album of the Year at the 30th Grammy Awards. It was voted as the best album of 1987 in The Village Voices Pazz & Jop critics' poll. According to Christgau, the poll's creator, the album was "easily the biggest winner" in the poll's history and "established Prince as the greatest rock and roll musician of the era—as singer-guitarist-hooksmith-beatmaster, he has no peer." The title track "Sign o' the Times" was named the best single of 1987 in the poll, while "I Could Never Take the Place of Your Man" and "U Got the Look" were also voted within the top 10. The album also ranked second among "Albums of the Year" for 1987 in the annual NME critics' poll, and the title track ranked number one among songs. In an interview in December 1989, Robert Smith of the Cure cited Sign o' the Times amongst the best things about the 1980s.

Reappraisal and legacy 

In the decades that followed, Sign o' the Times has been regarded by critics as Prince's best album. According to journalist Kristen Pyszczyk, "critics tend to be pretty evenly divided over Prince’s best album: about half will go for Purple Rain, and the rest usually vouch for Sign o' the Times, a double album sometimes regarded as Prince's magnum opus." In a retrospective review, John McKie of BBC News cited it as "one of the most acclaimed albums of the second half of the 20th century" and a "masterpiece - encompassing all of [Prince's] musical personas: bedroom balladeer; penitent Christian; one-track-mind loverman; modern-day Basie-style bandleader; whimsical storyteller; meticulous orchestrator, guitar-wielding axeman and pop craftsman." Simon Price deemed it Prince's best album, as did Michaelangelo Matos, who wrote in The Rolling Stone Album Guide (2004) that it was "the most complete example of his artistry's breadth, and arguably the finest album of the 1980s". Matos also believed it was "the last classic R&B album prior to hip hop's takeover of black music and the final four-sided blockbuster of the vinyl era".

Writing in The Brooklyn Rail, Grimstad said that Sign o' the Times is "to be included with other double sets that actually cohere (The White Album, The Basement Tapes, Something/Anything). Proves there is no limit to what [Prince] can do." In a BBC Music review, Daryl Easlea also compared the record to the Beatles' The White Album, saying "Although Sign ‘O’ The Times didn’t rival his commercial sales peak of Purple Rain, it is his [The] White Album". He also regarded Prince's Sign o' the Times era as one of the greatest eras in popular music: "This, and the supporting concert film [Sign o' the Times] remain one of the most scintillating documents of an artist at the summit of their powers...when you listen [again] to Sign 'O' The Times, you realise why Prince was routinely labelled a genius in the late 80s." Keith Harris of Blender called Sign o' the Times a "masterpiece" and comments that "never has [Prince's] curiosity about women strayed into so many unpredictable corners", while Slant Magazines Eric Henderson deemed it a "double-disc blowout of sweat, funk, and raw, concentrated talent". Kenneth Partridge of Billboard regarded Sign o' the Times as the album that broke the theory of Prince needing the Revolution to "keep him in check" and, like other critics, described the album as a "masterpiece". In a Pitchfork review, Nelson George regarded the artistry in Sign o' the Times as Prince's peak and that, even though some of the production sounds dated, "the scope of the songs, the musicianship, and overall arrangements are just too glorious to nitpick." He concluded that the restless power of the album saves it from being formulaic or complacent: "All these years later, it’s still a vibrant thing, the product of a great artist at the height of his power."

Sign o' the Times has appeared frequently on publications' lists and polls of the greatest albums. According to Acclaimed Music, it is the 30th most celebrated album in popular music history, and the best album of 1987.  In 1989, Time Out magazine ranked Sign o' the Times as the greatest album of all time. The album was ranked number 16 on the New Musical Express list of the All Time Top 100 Albums, 3rd in Hot Press magazine's list of the 100 Best Albums of All Time, and number 35 on VH1's 100 Greatest Albums. The album was also placed 8th on Nieuwe Revus Top 100 Albums of All Time. The Times listed Sign o' the Times as the 29th greatest album of all time.  It was voted number 19 in the third edition of Colin Larkin's All Time Top 1000 Albums (2000).  In 2003, the album was ranked number 93 on Rolling Stone list of The 500 Greatest Albums of All Time, maintaining the rank in the 2012 revision and moving up to number 45 in the 2020 reboot of the list. In 2006, Q magazine placed the album at number 12 in its list of "40 Best Albums of the '80s". In 2012, Slant Magazine listed the album at number 11 on its list of "Best Albums of the 1980s", calling it "Prince's most varied album and his most self-consciously auteurish". In 2017, Sign o' the Times was inducted into the Grammy Hall of Fame. In 2020, Kirk Johnson queried Prince’s fans via social media which song could be re-recorded by his former band members, and "The Cross" was selected.

Track listing

Original album
All songs written by Prince, except where noted.

Remastered, Deluxe and Super Deluxe editions
The Remastered edition contains a remaster of the original album (discs one and two). The Deluxe edition contains the remaster and a third disc with all the single and maxi-single mixes as well as the B-sides. The Super Deluxe edition contains six additional discs: Three of them contain 45 previously unissued studio tracks, two discs contain the live audio concert recordings of the Sign o' the Times Tour at stadium Galgenwaard in Utrecht, The Netherlands, and the last disc is a DVD with the live video concert recordings of the New Year's Eve show at Paisley Park, that has been bootlegged prior to this release. The albums were also issued on vinyl in a 2 LP, 2 LP peach vinyl, 4 LP and 13 LP + DVD set and are available on all digital download and streaming services. The video content is exclusive to the physical DVD and does not appear on digital download or streaming versions of the Super Deluxe Edition set. Released on September 25, 2020, Pitchfork rated the Super Deluxe version a 10 out of 10 and named it Best New Reissue.

All songs written by Prince, except where noted.

Personnel
 Prince – lead vocals and various instruments
 Wendy Melvoin – guitar and backing vocals (7), tambourine and congas (12, 15)
 Lisa Coleman – backing vocals (7), Fairlight sitar and wooden flute (12), keyboards and backing vocals (15)
 Sheila E. – drums and percussion (10), percussion and rap (15)
 Dr. Fink – keyboards (15)
 Miko Weaver – guitar (15)
 Brown Mark – bass (15)
 Bobby Z. – drums (15)
 Eric Leeds – saxophone (3, 7, 8, 15, 16)
 Atlanta Bliss – trumpet (3, 7, 15, 16)
 Susannah Melvoin – backing vocals (2, 4, 6), vocals (15)
 Jill Jones – vocals (15)
 Sheena Easton – contributing artist (10)
 Clare Fischer – string arrangements

The live audience on "It's Gonna Be a Beautiful Night" is credited for backing vocals under the name of "6,000 wonderful Parisians" and was recorded during a Parade Tour's show in Paris on 25 August 1986, while vocals, Sheila E.'s rap and instrumental overdubs were recorded at Sunset Sound on 22 November.

Charts

Weekly charts

Year-end charts

Certifications and sales

 

 

ReferencesBibliography'''
 

External links
 Sign O The Times at Discogs
 Sign O The Times at Prince Vault
 Classic Albums Revisited: Prince, Sign o' The Times at NBC Washington
 Song of the year: 1987: Prince Sign 'o' the Times at The Times''

1987 albums
Prince (musician) albums
Albums produced by Prince (musician)
Paisley Park Records albums
Warner Records albums
Albums recorded at Sunset Sound Recorders
Avant-pop albums
Albums recorded at United Western Recorders
Albums arranged by Clare Fischer
Albums recorded in a home studio